Thaumasianthes is a genus of flowering plants belonging to the family Loranthaceae.

Its native range is Philippines.

Species:

Thaumasianthes amplifolia

References

Loranthaceae
Loranthaceae genera